Haven Hill is a hill  west of Mount Tedrow, on the south side of Kent Glacier in the Queen Elizabeth Range of Antarctica. It was mapped by the United States Geological Survey from tellurometer surveys and Navy air photos, 1960–62, and was named by the Advisory Committee on Antarctic Names for Stoner B. Haven, a United States Antarctic Research Program biologist at McMurdo Sound in 1960.

References

Hills of the Ross Dependency
Shackleton Coast